Jeffrey E. Lantz (born 3 February 1961) is a Canadian lawyer, judge and former politician, who was elected to the Legislative Assembly of Prince Edward Island in the 2000 provincial election.

Educated at the University of Prince Edward Island and University of New Brunswick, Lantz practiced law in Charlottetown for twelve years. Lantz also served as president of the Heart and Stroke Foundation. He represented the electoral district of Charlottetown-Rochford Square and was a member of the Progressive Conservative Party. He served in the provincial cabinet as Attorney General, Minister of Education and Minister of Tourism. Lantz did not reoffer in the 2003 election.

After leaving politics, he was named a provincial court judge. His brother Rob Lantz later served as leader of the Progressive Conservative Party.

References 
Sources
 O'Handley, K Canadian Parliamentary Guide, 2000 
Notes

Living people
Justices of the Provincial Court of Prince Edward Island
Judges in Prince Edward Island
Lawyers in Prince Edward Island
Progressive Conservative Party of Prince Edward Island MLAs
People from Charlottetown
Members of the Executive Council of Prince Edward Island
University of Prince Edward Island alumni
University of New Brunswick alumni
University of New Brunswick Faculty of Law alumni
21st-century Canadian politicians
1961 births